Keep Right is the seventh solo studio album (and thirteenth overall) by American rapper and record producer KRS-One. It was released on July 13, 2004 via Grit Records bundled with a free DVD. Production was handled by Domingo, B. Creative, Daneja, Fatin "10" Horton, Soul Supreme, Gato, Commissioner Gordon, DJ Qbert, John Doe, Rich Nice, Statik Selektah and KRS-One himself. It features guest appearances from Minister Server, Afrika Bambaataa, L da Headtoucha, Akbar, An Ion, Illin' P, Joe, Mad Lion, Mix Master Mike and Supastition.

The album peaked at number 80 on the Billboard Top R&B/Hip-Hop Albums.

Track listing

Charts

References

External links

2004 albums
KRS-One albums
Albums produced by KRS-One
Albums produced by Statik Selektah
Albums produced by Domingo (producer)